The 2004 Minnesota Golden Gophers football team represented the University of Minnesota during the 2004 NCAA Division I-A football season. The team's coach was Glen Mason. It played its home games at the Hubert H. Humphrey Metrodome in Minneapolis Minnesota.

Previous season
2003 was the seventh season under head coach Glen Mason.  He led the team to a 10–3 record and an appearance in the Sun Bowl.  It was the first time since 1905 the Gophers had won 10 games in a season.

Polls
The 2004 Minnesota Golden Gophers football team was not ranked in either the final Coaches' Poll or AP Poll.

Schedule

Roster

References

Minnesota
Minnesota Golden Gophers football seasons
Music City Bowl champion seasons
Minnesota Golden Gophers football